Roberto Rojas (1966–2022) was a Bolivian politician and trade unionist.

Roberto Rojas may also refer to:
 Roberto Rojas (Peruvian footballer) (1955–1991), Peruvian footballer
 Roberto Rojas (Chilean footballer) (born 1957), Chilean footballer
 Roberto Rojas (Spanish footballer) (born 1974), Spanish footballer

See also 
 Robert Rojas (born 1996), Paraguayan footballer
 Roberto Roxas (born 1946), Filipino cyclist